Frank Buchanan may refer to:

 Frank Buchanan (Pennsylvania politician) (1902–1951), Democratic member of the U.S. House of Representatives from Pennsylvania
 Frank Buchanan (Illinois politician) (1862–1930), Democratic member of the U.S. House of Representatives from Illinois
 Franklin Buchanan (1800–1874), Naval officer in the United States Navy and Confederate States Navy